This is the discography of Rhapsody of Fire, an Italian symphonic power metal band. It includes thirteen studio albums, three EPs, and various other media. Founded in 1993 in Trieste, the band originally released albums under the name Thundercross, but used the name Rhapsody from 1995 to July 2006. In 2006, they changed their name into Rhapsody of Fire.

Albums

Saga key:
† Part of The Emerald Sword Saga.
‡ Part of The Dark Secret Saga.
¶ Part of The Nephilim's Empire Saga.

EPs

Saga key:
‡ Part of The Dark Secret Saga.

Singles

Live albums

Compilations

Demos

Videos/DVDs

Music videos
"Emerald Sword" (1998)
"Wisdom of the Kings" (2000)
"Holy Thunderforce" (2001)
"Rain of a Thousand Flames" (2001)
"Power of the Dragonflame" (2002)
"Unholy Warcry" (2004)
"The Magic of the Wizard's Dream" (2006)
"Sea of Fate" (2010)
"Dark Wings of Steel" (2014)
"Into the Legend" (2015)
"Rain of Fury" (2019)
"Chains of Destiny" (2021)
"Un'ode per l'eroe" (2021)
"Magic Signs" (2022)

References

Discography
Heavy metal group discographies
Discographies of Italian artists